Sebastião is Portuguese for Sebastian.

This name may refer to:

People
 Sebastião (given name)

Places
 Sebastião Barros, a town in the state of Piauí, Brazil
 Sebastião Laranjeiras, a city in the state of Bahia, Brazil
 Sebastião Leal, a town in the state of Piauí, Brazil

Other
 São Sebastião, Portuguese for Saint Sebastian